Javier Gonzalez Caceres (born September 6, 1962, in Mexico) is a professional racecar driver. He is best known internationally for his part-season drive in the Barber Dodge Pro Series season of 2002. He also enjoys sponsoring Mexican children..

Complete motorsports results

American Open-Wheel racing results
(key) (Races in bold indicate pole position, races in italics indicate fastest race lap)

Barber Dodge Pro Series

Notes

External links

1962 births
Living people
Mexican racing drivers
Barber Pro Series drivers